Jalen Carnell Collins (born March 20, 1993) is an American professional football defensive back who is a free agent. He played college football at LSU and was drafted by the Atlanta Falcons in the second round of the 2015 NFL Draft. Collins has also played in the Canadian Football League

High school career
Collins played three seasons at DeSoto Central High School in Southaven, Mississippi, where he played football and ran track. He then transferred to Olive Branch High School for his senior season, in which he recorded 45 tackles, three interceptions and two blocked field goals. He was selected to play in the Mississippi-Alabama All-Star Classic. In track & field, Collins competed as a hurdler at DeSoto and posted personal-bests of 14.68 seconds in the 110 metres hurdles and 40.09 seconds in the 300 metres hurdles.

Considered a four-star recruit by Rivals.com, Collins was rated as the 22nd best cornerback prospect of his class. A member of Rivals.com Top 250. Rated the No. 249 prospect nationally and as the No. 22 cornerback by Rivals.com. Ranked No. 85 in the Press-Register Super Southeast120. Named to the Mississippi 6A First-team All-State by the Mississippi Association of Coaches. Named to the first-team All-State by the Clarion Ledger. He announced his commitment to LSU on July 27, 2010, after receiving a scholarship offer from the school one week before at a summer camp hosted by LSU.

College career
Collins red-shirted as a true freshman. In 2012, he played in 13 games, and started one against Texas A&M, where he recorded an interception. He finished the season with 30 tackles, two interceptions, and eight pass break-ups. In 2013, Collins played in all 13 games, while starting two. He recorded 22 tackles and added two pass break-ups. In 2014, he earned a starting position for the Tigers. He recorded 33 tackles, with two for loss, one interception and nine pass break-ups.

Following the season, Collins announced that he would forgo his remaining eligibility and enter the 2015 NFL Draft.

Professional career
Coming out of LSU, Collins was projected as a first round pick by the majority of scouts and analysts. He was ranked the seventh best cornerback by NFLDraftScout.com and the second best cornerback by NFL analysts Mike Mayock. Five of six mock drafts by NFL Media analysts had Collins going in the first round. Although he was coming off foot surgery, he was able to participate at the NFL Combine and completed most of the drills and workouts. Collins was unable to workout at LSU's Pro Day due to a foot injury. A week before the draft, NFL Media analysts Albert Breer reported that multiple teams had knowledge of multiple failed drug tests by him during his time at LSU. Before this the New Orleans Saints and Pittsburgh Steelers were the two main teams to express serious interest in drafting him. NFL analyst Daniel Jeremiah projected Collins being selected in the second round following the findings of the failed drug tests.

Atlanta Falcons

The Atlanta Falcons selected Collins in the second round (42nd overall) of the 2015 NFL Draft. He was the fifth cornerback selected in the draft.

2015
On May 9, 2015, the Falcons signed Collins to a four-year, $5.42 million contract with $2.88 million guaranteed and a signing bonus of $2.20 million.

Collins entered training camp competing with Robert Alford, Desmond Trufant, and Phillip Adams for a starting cornerback position. Collins was named the fourth cornerback on the depth chart to begin the regular season behind Alford, Trufant, and Adams.

Collins made his professional regular season debut in the Falcons' season opener against the Philadelphia Eagles and made two solo tackles in the 26–24 victory on Monday Night Football. During a Week 7 matchup against the Tennessee Titans, Collins made his first career start in a 10–7 win. On November 8, 2015, he made his second career start and recorded a season-high five solo tackles during a 17–16 loss to the San Francisco 49ers. He finished his rookie season with 18 combined tackles in 16 games and two starts.

2016
San Diego Chargers 33–30. He made his first start of the season in Week 9 after Desmond Trufant suffered a shoulder injury and was placed on injured-reserve. Collins recorded six solo tackles in a 24–15 loss to the Philadelphia Eagles. The next game, he made six combined tackles and a season-high three pass deflections during a 38–19 victory over the Arizona Cardinals. On December 24, 2016, he had a season-high recorded six solo tackles, two pass deflections, and intercepted Cam Newton for the first pick of his career, as the Falcons routed the Carolina Panthers 33–16. The following week, he recorded five solo tackles, three pass deflections, and intercepted Drew Brees in a 38–32 win over the New Orleans Saints.

Collins finished the season with 31 combined tackles (28 solo), ten pass deflections, and two interceptions in eight games and six starts. With the last two victories of the season, the Atlanta Falcons managed to finish second in the NFC with an 11–5 record.

On January 14, 2017, Collins appeared in his first career postseason game and recorded four solo tackles and a pass deflection in a 36–20 NFC Divisional game victory over the Seattle Seahawks. On January 22, 2017, he forced a key fumble after he stripped the ball away from Green Bay Packers' fullback Aaron Ripkowski and recovered it, leading to a touchdown. He also made three combined tackles and a pass deflection as the Falcons routed the Green Bay Packers 44–21. In Super Bowl LI against the New England Patriots, Collins had a team-high eleven total tackles in the 34–28 loss in overtime.

2017
Collins was suspended the first 10 games of the 2017 season for again violating the NFL's policy on performing enhancing substances. On November 21, 2017, Collins was released by the Falcons after being reinstated from his suspension. On December 7, 2017, he was subsequently suspended for 4 more games for unspecified reasons.

2018
On April 9, 2018, Collins was suspended for the fourth time in his career and received a ten-game suspension.

Indianapolis Colts
On November 15, 2018, Collins, after being reinstated from his suspension, was signed to the Indianapolis Colts practice squad. He was promoted to the active roster on December 29, 2018, but was waived two days later and re-signed to the practice squad. He signed a future/reserve contract on January 13, 2019.

On August 31, 2019, Collins was waived by the Colts and was signed to the practice squad the next day. He was released on September 30, 2019.

Los Angeles Wildcats
On November 22, 2019, Collins was selected by the Los Angeles Wildcats in the 2020 XFL Supplemental Draft.

Tampa Bay Vipers 
On December 17, 2019, Collins was traded to the Tampa Bay Vipers in exchange for Arrion Springs. Collins was waived on March 3, 2020.

Toronto Argonauts 
On October 1, 2021, it was announced that Collins had signed with the Toronto Argonauts. He dressed in his first CFL game on October 22, 2021, against the Montreal Alouettes, where he had four defensive tackles.

Edmonton Elks
The Edmonton Elks traded for Collins just before the 2022 CFL season, acquiring him and Martez Ivey from the Toronto Argonauts for a 2023 6th Round Draft Pick. He was released on July 17, 2022.

References

External links
Toronto Argonauts bio
LSU Tigers bio

Living people
1993 births
Players of American football from Kansas City, Missouri
Players of Canadian football from Kansas City, Missouri
American football cornerbacks
LSU Tigers football players
Atlanta Falcons players
Indianapolis Colts players
Los Angeles Wildcats (XFL) players
Tampa Bay Vipers players